is a Japanese long-distance runner. She competed in the 5000 metres at the 1996 Summer Olympics and the 2000 Summer Olympics.

References

1976 births
Living people
Place of birth missing (living people)
Japanese female long-distance runners
Olympic female long-distance runners
Olympic athletes of Japan
Athletes (track and field) at the 1996 Summer Olympics
Athletes (track and field) at the 2000 Summer Olympics
Asian Games medalists in athletics (track and field)
Asian Games bronze medalists for Japan
Athletes (track and field) at the 1994 Asian Games
Athletes (track and field) at the 2002 Asian Games
Medalists at the 2002 Asian Games
20th-century Japanese women
21st-century Japanese women